The Marsh Academy, formerly Southland's Community Comprehensive School, is a non-selective secondary school in New Romney, Kent, England. The school is supported by the Skinners’ Company.

Students attend from all over Romney Marsh.

History
From 7 September 1977 until 24 July 2015, the Romney, Hythe and Dymchurch Railway provided school trains to transport children to and from the Academy. The service was finally withdrawn due to falling usage.

In 1956, the grounds were initially used as a prison grounds using the interconnect tunnel underneath the road as an entrance, at a later date the tunnel was filled in due to safety concerns, splitting the grounds into two, one being transformed as commercial property, meanwhile a school was built on the unused land.

Description
A school serving a 1000 children in an isolated rural coastal location.

References

 Teach Web The Marsh Academy, Kent
 Ofsted's boost to Marsh Academy after criticism from parents

External links
 The Marsh Academy
 The March Academy School Prospectus
 The Marsh Academy Leisure Centre

Secondary schools in Kent
Academies in Kent